The 2012 Ms. Olympia contest was an IFBB professional bodybuilding competition and part of Joe Weider's Olympia Fitness & Performance Weekend 2012 was held on September 28, 2012, at the South Hall in the Las Vegas Convention Center in Winchester, Nevada and in the Orleans Arena at The Orleans Hotel and Casino in Paradise, Nevada.  It was the 33rd Ms. Olympia competition held.  Other events at the exhibition included the 212 Olympia Showdown, Mr. Olympia, Fitness Olympia, Figure Olympia, and Bikini Olympia contests.

Prize money
1st $28,000
2nd $14,000
3rd $8,000
4th $5,000
5th $3,000
6th $2,000
Total: $60,000

Results
1st - Iris Kyle
2nd - Debi Laszewski
3rd - Yaxeni Oriquen-Garcia
4th - Alina Popa
5th - Brigita Brezovac
6th - Sheila Bleck
7th - Monique Jones
8th - Anne Freitas
9th - Michelle Cummings
10th - Sarah Hayes
11th - Kim Buck
12th - Helle Trevino
13th - Lisa Giesbrecht
Comparison to previous Olympia results:
Same - Iris Kyle
+2 - Debi Laszewski
-1 - Yaxeni Oriquen-Garcia
+1 - Alina Popa
-2 - Brigita Brezovac
Same - Sheila Bleck
+2 - Monique Jones
+2 - Helle Trevino

Scorecard

Attended
15th Ms. Olympia attended - Yaxeni Oriquen-Garcia
14th Ms. Olympia attended - Iris Kyle
4th Ms. Olympia attended - Debi Laszewski
3rd Ms. Olympia attended - Sheila Bleck and Helle Trevino
2nd Ms. Olympia attended - Brigita Brezovac, Kim Buck, Monique Jones, and Alina Popa
1st Ms. Olympia attended - Sarah Hayes, Lisa Giesbrecht, Michelle Cummings, and Anne Freitas
Previous year Olympia attendees who did not attend - Dayana Cadeau, Cathy LeFrançois, Heather Foster, Tina Chandler, Nicole Ball, Kim Perez, Mah Ann Mendoza, and Skadi Frei-Seifert

Notable events
This was Iris Kyle's 8th overall Olympia win, thus tied her with Lenda Murray for the most overall Ms. Olympia wins. This was also Iris's 7th consecutive Ms. Olympia win, breaking the record of six consecutive wins she shared with Lenda Murray and Cory Everson.
Debi Lazewski placed 2nd this Olympia, the best placing she has ever had at the Olympia.
Although Cathy LeFrançois qualified for the 2012 Ms. Olympia, she didn't find out she qualified until 6 weeks until the Olympia and thus did not attend.
The song played during the posedown was Gasolina (Lil Jon remix) by Daddy Yankee, Lil Jon, and Pitbull.

2012 Ms. Olympia Qualified

Points standings

 In the event of a tie, the competitor with the best top five contest placings will be awarded the qualification. If both competitors have the same contest placings, than both will qualify for the Olympia.

See also
 2012 Mr. Olympia

References

2012 in bodybuilding
Ms. Olympia
Ms. Olympia
History of female bodybuilding
Ms. Olympia 2012